The Robert A. Heinlein Award was established by the Heinlein Society in 2003 "for outstanding published works in science fiction and technical writings to inspire the human exploration of space". It is named for renowned science fiction author Robert A. Heinlein and is administered by the Baltimore Science Fiction Society. It is generally given annually to one or more recipients.

The Robert A. Heinlein Award is a sterling silver medallion bearing the image of Robert A. Heinlein, as depicted by artist Arlin Robbins. The medallion is matched with a red-white-blue lanyard.

Winners

References

External links
 The Heinlein Society

Awards established in 2003
2003 establishments in the United States
Award
Science fiction awards
H